Williamstown Beach railway station is located on the Williamstown line in Victoria, Australia. It serves the western Melbourne suburb of Williamstown, and it opened on 7 August 1889 as Beach. It was renamed Williamstown Beach on 1 February 1915.

In 1961, boom barriers replaced hand gates at the Giffard Street level crossing, located nearby in the Down direction of the station. In 1965, a number of sidings, points and signals at the station were abolished.

Platforms and services

Williamstown Beach has two side platforms. It is serviced by Metro Trains' Williamstown line services.

Platform 1:
  all stations services to Flinders Street and Frankston

Platform 2:
  all stations services to Williamstown

References

External links
 Rail Geelong gallery

Railway stations in Melbourne
Railway stations in Australia opened in 1889
Williamstown, Victoria
Railway stations in the City of Hobsons Bay